Brian Robert Gibbons (born February 26, 1988) is an American professional ice hockey winger who is currently under contract with ERC Ingolstadt of the Deutsche Eishockey Liga (DEL). He has formerly played for the Pittsburgh Penguins, Columbus Blue Jackets, New Jersey Devils, Anaheim Ducks, Ottawa Senators and Carolina Hurricanes.

Playing career
Prior to turning professional, Gibbons attended the Boston College where he played four seasons with the Boston College Eagles men's ice hockey team which competes in NCAA's Division I in the Hockey East conference.

On April 4, 2011 Gibbons signed a two-year, entry level contract with the Pittsburgh Penguins worth $1.8 million at the NHL level.

In the 2013–14 season, Gibbons received his first recall by Pittsburgh and scored his first NHL goal in his debut game on his first shot on November 18, 2013, against Viktor Fasth of the Anaheim Ducks. He scored his first power play goal on February 3, 2014, off a deflection from Olli Määttä against Craig Anderson of the Ottawa Senators.

On July 4, 2014, Gibbons left the Penguins organization as a free agent and signed a one-year, two-way contract with the Columbus Blue Jackets.

On July 1, 2015, Gibbons signed as a free agent to a one-year, two-way contract with the New York Rangers. He was assigned by the Rangers to AHL affiliate, the Hartford Wolf Pack, for the duration of the 2015–16 season, compiling 23 points in 63 games.

Unable to feature with the Rangers, Gibbons left as a free agent in the off-season. Unable to secure an NHL contract, he signed a Professional Try-out deal to attend training camp with the New Jersey Devils on September 15, 2016. He later signed a one-year AHL deal with affiliate, the Albany Devils on October 4, 2016.

On July 1, 2017, Gibbons after a successful tenure in the AHL, finally was offered and agreed to a one-year, two-way contract with the New Jersey Devils for the following 2017–18 season. In the 2017–18 season, Gibbons made a return to the NHL in surprisingly making the Devils opening night roster. In using his speed and high intensity, Gibbons made an impression with the Devils, scoring career highs with 12 goals, 14 assists and 26 points in 59 games.

On July 2, 2018, Gibbons was signed to a one-year, $1 million contract by the Anaheim Ducks. In the 2018–19 season, he recorded two goals and five points in 44 games for Ducks before he was placed on waivers on February 15, 2019. Unable to replicate his previous offensive totals Gibbons was then assigned to AHL affiliate, the San Diego Gulls, however, before reporting he was traded by the Ducks at the trade deadline to the Ottawa Senators in exchange for Patrick Sieloff on February 25, 2019. Gibbons made an instant impact with the cellar-dwelling Senators, recording 6 goals and 14 points in 20 games to end the regular season.

On July 4, 2019, Gibbons signed as a free agent to a one-year, two-way $725,000 contract with the Carolina Hurricanes. Gibbons split the 2019–20 season, between the Hurricanes and AHL affiliate, the Charlotte Checkers, going scoreless in 15 games in the NHL.

Left off the Hurricanes Return to Play roster, Gibbons as a free agent joined Swiss club, Lausanne HC of the National League (NL), on a one-year deal on July 28, 2020.

Limited to just 17 games through his solitary season in the Swedish Hockey League (SHL) with Linköping HC in 2021–22, Gibbons lefts as a free agent and continued his European career by signing a one-year deal with German outfit, ERC Ingolstadt of the DEL, on August 1, 2022.

Career statistics

Regular season and playoffs

International

Awards and honors

References

External links

 

1988 births
Living people
Albany Devils players
American men's ice hockey right wingers
Anaheim Ducks players
Boston College Eagles men's ice hockey players
Carolina Hurricanes players
Charlotte Checkers (2010–) players
Columbus Blue Jackets players
ERC Ingolstadt players
Hartford Wolf Pack players
Ice hockey players from Massachusetts
Lausanne HC players
Linköping HC players
New Jersey Devils players
Ottawa Senators players
Pittsburgh Penguins players
Springfield Falcons players
Sportspeople from Braintree, Massachusetts
Undrafted National Hockey League players
Wilkes-Barre/Scranton Penguins players